Saint-Estèphe is a commune in the Gironde department in Nouvelle-Aquitaine in southwestern France.

Geography

Population

Wine

Saint-Estèphe is best known as the northernmost, and one of the four major wine-growing appellations of the Médoc.
The grounds of St.-Estèphe are varied centered in Château Phélan-Ségur. To the south-east corner of the appellation area, they are similar to those of Pauillac, with deep gravels lying on a hard sandstone base. Progressively to the west and north, they get more clayey, less gravelly, and become heavier. In parts, veins of alios (a reduced form of iron) can be found.
The layers of gravel on top of clay lead to comparatively poor drainage, and the harvest is one of the latest of the whole region, although this water retention can be of use in vintages of low rainfall.

See also
French wine
Bordeaux Wine
Bordeaux wine regions
Communes of the Gironde department

References

Communes of Gironde